Old Rock House, also known as Shapley Ross House, is a historic home located at Moscow Mills, Lincoln County, Missouri. It was built between about 1818 and 1821, and is a two-story, five bay, Classical Revival style squared rubble limestone dwelling, with a two-story rear ell added about 1870.  The house measures 56 feet, 6 inches, wide and 46 feet, 3 1/2 inches, deep.

It was listed on the National Register of Historic Places in 1972.

References

Houses on the National Register of Historic Places in Missouri
Neoclassical architecture in Missouri
Houses completed in 1818
Houses in Lincoln County, Missouri
National Register of Historic Places in Lincoln County, Missouri